Ho-Ag was an experimental "noise rock" band based in Boston, Massachusetts.  Known for melding the creaky musical worlds of 50s and 60s sci-fi films, Waitsian dissonant underworld, and fast-paced math-punk, Ho-Ag adapted through several line-up changes, earning comparisons to acts like Six Finger Satellite, The Dismemberment Plan, Brainiac and The Melvins.

History
Ho-Ag was officially formed over the summer of 2001 by founding members Matt Parish, Patrick Kim, Dave Dines and Jonathan Ruhe (The Gersch, Cokedealer, Justine, Isle of Citadel). The group's first show came in Boston at The Midway Cafe in May 2002 with Young Sexy Assassins (their 2nd show), Tunnel of Love, and USAISAMONSTER.

"Ho Ag Equals Go At," engineered and mixed by Parish on an 8-track machine, was released by Mister Records in May 2003. Drummer Eric Meyer recorded drums with the group in January 2004 for a 7" record to be released by Mister Records and soon became a full-time member.

2005 saw the release of EP Pray for the Worms, again recorded on Parish's 8-track.  Self-released under the moniker "Hive 35", the CD was the band's first to receive consistent national press and radio airplay. Two national tours followed that year.

The band spent the winter recording their first full-length together at Machines With Magnets, a Providence, Rhode Island studio run by Keith Souza.  The album, The Word from Pluto, was completed in January 2006 and released in September 2006 by Hello Sir Records.

Ward and Kim both left the band in early 2007.  Kristina Johnson (Roh Delikat; Certainly, Sir) joined on guitar and Ryan Brown joined on bass.  The next year, they recorded Doctor Cowboy with Boston engineer Kevin Micka (Animal Hospital, The Common Cold).  That album was released in July 2008 on Hello Sir Records.

Discography
The Meteor Is a Decoy (Demo, 2002)
People Coming Back In Time for Me (Self-Released, 2002)
Mister Records Comp 2003 (Mister Records, 2003)
Ho Ag Equals Go At (Mister Records, 2003)
Mister Records Comp 3.0 (Mister Records, 2005)
Ho-Ag/Laughing Light Split 7" (Mister Records, 2005)
Pray for the Worms (Hive 35, 2005)
The Word from Pluto (Hello Sir Records, 2006)
Elektra/Elektro EP (Hive 35, 2007)
Doctor Cowboy (Hello Sir Records, 2008)
World-Destroying Zig-Zags (Hive 35, 2013)
No More Masterpieces (Hive 35, 2013)

Related projects

The Rancid Yak Butter Tea Party
Hallelujah the Hills
Roh Delikat
Eileen Rose
The Stairs
Hex Map

References

External links
Ho-Ag official site

American noise rock music groups